Vladimir Zografski, born 14 July 1993 in Samokov, Bulgaria, is a Bulgarian ski jumper. He took 14th place at the normal hill individual event at the 2018 Winter Olympics, which was the best result for a Bulgarian ski jumper in Olympic history, beating Vladimir Breitchev's 19th place at the 1984 Winter Olympics. Zografski is the son of former Olympic ski jumper Emil Zografski.

Zografski's instructors are Joachim Winterlich, the trainer of the successful German ski jumper Jens Weißflog, and his father Emil Zografski. Vladimir has a younger brother, Martin Zografski, who is also a ski jumper and part of the Bulgarian development team.

Career

Early years and World Cup debut (2005-2010)
Zografski's started jumping at an early age in the plastic-covered hills at Chernia kos near his hometown of Samokov. His debut in the Ski jumping Continental Cup took place in 2005 when Zografski was 12 years old. In 2007 he made his debut in the Junior World Championships in Tarvisio, Italy, finishing last. His best placement in the 2008 Ski Jumping Fis-Cup was fourth place in Oberwiesenthal, while he managed 23rd in Villach during the 2008 Continental Cup.

Zografski made his World Cup debut in December 2008, finishing 43rd in Pragelato. He then received the silver medal at the 2009 European Olympic Youth Festival in Silesia, before finishing 43rd in the Normal Hill competition during the 2009 World Championships in Liberec. Zografski recorded his best-ever WC placement during a 2009 Summer Grand-Prix competition in Klingenthal, finishing 36th. He ended up 9th at Bischofshofen 2010 for the Ski jumping Continental Cup, his best result in the competition.

During the winter of 2010, Zografski participated in the Junior World Championships in Hinterzarten, Germany, finishing 7th with jumps of 104 and 99 meters. He finished 4th in a summer CoC competition in Garmisch-Partenkirchen and made it to the second round of the Summer Grand Prix (SGP) a week later, eventually finishing in 17th and recording his first points at the highest level of ski jumping competition. In August 2010, Zografski reached a new career high by finishing 5th at the SGP in Courchevel, and later won silver twice at the Continental Cup in Almaty, Kazakhstan.

First World Cup points and international breakthrough (2011-2013)
The 2010/11 season did not start well in Kuusamo and Kuopio, but in Engelberg, Zografski got his first World Cup points ever thanks to 28th- and 23rd-place finishes. He continued with 16th and 19th place in Oberstdorf and Garmisch-Partenkirchen during the 2011 Four Hills Tournament but was disqualified in Innsbruck for fielding skis that were deemed too long. The event later started a major conflict in ski jumping, with Zografski's father and coach Emil Zografski arguing that Eastern European athletes and lesser-known jumpers were being treated worse by the FIS. Zografski failed to reach the final 4HT competition in Bischofshofen and finished 37th overall with 450.6 points. In 2011 he also won the Junior World Championships in Otepää, Estonia, ahead of Kaarel Nurmsalu.

In 2011–12 Zografski had his major international breakthrough. After finishing 12th at the Summer Grand Prix and picking up a few top-5 placements, he started the World Cup season in Kuusamo. Although not able to pick up any wins or podiums, Zografski established himself as one of the top athletes in the World Cup. His best performance was 8th place at Lillehammer, though he frequently finished in the top 20. By this time, Zografski was also becoming more known in his home country Bulgaria and started receiving features in TV, radio and print media. He also won the Winter Sports Performance of the Year award in Bulgaria due to his World Championship win in Otepää. The latter part of the season found Zografski in poorer form, as he failed to qualify for several World Cup events. He finished the season with 20th place in Holmenkollen, Oslo, with a total of 61 points and an overall rank of 45th.

In April 2012, Zografski was sidelined for a while due to an arm injury but returned for the first Grand Prix competition in Poland. As in the previous year, he was very successful in the Summer Grand Prix, finishing 13th overall, with a 4th-place finish in Hakuba being the highlight. During the 2012–13 World Cup season, Zografski picked up points in several competitions, ending the season in 33rd place overall with a personal best points tally of 183.

Olympic Games and new career highs (2014-present)

At the 2018 Winter Olympics, Zografski took 14th place at the normal hill individual event and 35th at the large hill individual event. The former was the best-ever finish for a Bulgarian ski jumper at the Olympics, beating the previous record held by Vladimir Breitchev, who finished 19th on the K-70 hill at the 1984 games.

In November 2018, Zografski finished 6th in Ruka, bettering his record for the best result by a Bulgarian jumper in a World Cup race.

Record

World Cup

Individual starts (166)

World Ski Championships

Olympic Games

References

External links
 Samokov Hills

1993 births
Living people
People from Samokov
Bulgarian male ski jumpers
Ski jumpers at the 2014 Winter Olympics
Ski jumpers at the 2018 Winter Olympics
Ski jumpers at the 2022 Winter Olympics
Olympic ski jumpers of Bulgaria
Universiade medalists in ski jumping
Universiade gold medalists for Bulgaria
Competitors at the 2015 Winter Universiade
Sportspeople from Sofia Province